Gérard de Balorre (1899–1974) was a French equestrian. He won a silver medal in team dressage at the 1936 Summer Olympics in Berlin, together with André Jousseaume and Daniel Gillois.

Personal life
Balorre was born in Paris on 25 November 1899. He died on 6 December 1974.

References

External links
 

1899 births
1974 deaths
Sportspeople from Paris
French male equestrians
Olympic equestrians of France
Olympic silver medalists for France
Equestrians at the 1936 Summer Olympics
Olympic medalists in equestrian
Medalists at the 1936 Summer Olympics